Bahu Bharya (Polygyny) is a 1999 Sri Lankan Sinhala adult suspense thriller film directed by Udayakantha Warnasuriya and produced by Ranjith Jayasuriya for Ureka Films. It stars Ranjan Ramanayake and Vasanthi Chathurani in lead roles along with Sangeetha Weeraratne and Srinath Maddumage. Music composed by Dilup Gabadamudalige. It is the 912th Sri Lankan film in the Sinhala cinema.

The film was loosely based on the film Fatal Attraction by Adrian Lyne.

Plot
Kapila is a senior executive officer of a construction company and works in head office and occasionally visits sites. On a way to a site in the rain at night, his path is blocked by a tree collapsed to the road. He goes to a close by house to request an axe and to ask whether any male is there to help him. He gets the tool but no males at the house. When he works on cutting the tree and clear the path, Theja, a young woman at the house comes to help him. As both or their clothes are wet they goes to the house to change. There they get aroused by each other's bodies and have sexual intercourse. This relationship develops with the time and Theja wants to have him so in order to that she tries to kill his wife Navoda. In the attempt to take Navoda's life, Theja is killed by Navoda. Kapila takes to blame and goes to prison. After release he is reunited with his family.

Cast
 Ranjan Ramanayake	as Kapila	
 Vasanthi Chathurani as Navoda
 Sangeetha Weeraratne as Theja
 Srinath Maddumage	
 Janak Premalal
 Ranjith De Silva		
 Susan Fernando as Samson	
 Sudath Kumara		
 Sulakkana Mihiripenna		
 Sanduni Warnasuriya

References

External links
 
 Bahu Bharya on Torana Video

1999 films
1990s Sinhala-language films
Films directed by Udayakantha Warnasuriya